is the eighth major single (11th overall) released by Scandal. It was released in four versions: three limited CD+DVD editions and a regular CD-only edition. All limited editions came housed in a cardboard case along with a first press bonus of a button badge. The limited editions and the first press of the regular edition also came with a special photo booklet and a greeting event application card. Each DVD contains the full version of one of the band's performances on their television show Shiteki Ongaku Jijou. The title track was written and composed by the husband-and-wife duo Yoko Aki and Ryudo Uzaki, who are known for creating many songs for Momoe Yamaguchi. The single reached #3 on the Oricon weekly chart and charted for seven weeks, selling 35,772 copies, making it Scandal's physically best selling single.

Track listing

References 

2010 singles
Songs with music by Ryudo Uzaki
Scandal (Japanese band) songs
Epic Records singles
Songs with lyrics by Yoko Aki
2010 songs